MediaBrowser (MediaBrowser.com, Inc.) was a Web browser branding company that started in 2000 by Mark C. Brown. They made specially branded versions of Internet Explorer for various company brands and themes. Because the branded web browsers made by MediaBrowser require Internet Explorer 5 or higher it is only supported on Windows operating systems. On December 5, 2001, Mediabrowser.com, Inc. went bankrupt and shut down their site and its branded web browsers.

System requirements 
Windows 95 to Windows XP, Internet Explorer 5.0 or higher, Windows Media Player 6.4 or higher, Macromedia Flash Player 4.0 or higher.
Also a 486 MHz or higher processor, 32 MB of RAM, 5 MB of free hard drive space, and an active Internet connection.

Due to compatibility issues, MediaBrowser is not compatible with Windows Vista or Windows 7; however it can be run under Windows XP Compatibility Mode.

Browser registration 
Upon new installation of a MediaBrowser branded browser the user was required to register their web browser using MediaBrowser's online registration form that asked for their name, address, etc. if they were over 12 years old. When MediaBrowser was shut down the registration process was broken (as the registration form was hosted on their now defunct web site) therefore users would not be able to use it unless they modified a value in Windows Registry.

Branding 

The branding consisted of various brand images on the background, navigation buttons, splash screen and links to specific web pages that related to the brand of the company. MediaBrower also had a space for ads to display at the bottom of the web browser. MediaBrowser's MicroTron was also included in every MediaBrowser branding to display brand-related video content to the user.

Nintendo and MediaBrowser 
 In late 2000, video game company Nintendo partnered with MediaBrowser to make branded browsers of their new and upcoming video games. The first two browsers to be released were for the (then upcoming) Pokémon Gold and Silver video games and Mario Tennis. Retailers gave out CD-ROM copies of the branded Pokémon GS browser to anyone who pre-ordered a copy of Pokémon Gold or Silver as a special promotion. Later in 2001, other browsers were released branded with other Nintendo games such as Paper Mario and Legend of Zelda: Majora's Mask. A Nintendo Power branded browser was released as well.

Bankruptcy 
MediaBrowser.com, Inc. went bankrupt on December 5, 2001 under Chapter 7 filing due to company debts of $2.49 million and various unpaid loans. The web site containing all the branded web browsers was pulled and Nintendo posted a notice on their downloads page stating "Nintendo's custom browsers are currently unavailable. We do not have a date for when they will return, but keep checking the Nintendo.com downloads page for updates. Thanks!"

See also 
Internet Explorer

References

External links 
 
 Braun Communication (successor company to MediaBrowser)

2000 software
Discontinued software
Discontinued web browsers
Internet Explorer
Internet_Explorer_shells
Windows Internet software